Michael Anthony Smith (born October 31, 1963) is an American former baseball player who was a pitcher in Major League Baseball with the Baltimore Orioles from 1989 to 1990.

References

External links
, or Retrosheet, or Pura Pelota (Venezuelan Winter League)

1963 births
Living people
Abilene Prairie Dogs players
African-American baseball players
Alexandria Aces players
Amarillo Dillas players
American expatriate baseball players in Mexico
Baltimore Orioles players
Baseball players from San Antonio
Billings Mustangs players
Cedar Rapids Reds players
Chattanooga Lookouts players
Coastal Bend Aviators players
El Paso Diablos players
Fort Worth Cats players
Gulf Coast Reds players
Major League Baseball pitchers
Mexican League baseball pitchers
Newark Bears players
Paris Dragons baseball players
Ranger Rangers baseball players
Rochester Red Wings players
Saraperos de Saltillo players
Springfield/Ozark Mountain Ducks players
Tigres de Aragua players
American expatriate baseball players in Venezuela
Tigres del México players
Vermont Reds players
21st-century African-American people
20th-century African-American sportspeople